Ripon was a constituency sending members to the House of Commons of the Parliament of the United Kingdom until 1983, centred on the city of Ripon in North Yorkshire.

History
Ripon was first represented in the Model Parliament of 1295, and also returned members in  1307 and 1337, but it was not permanently represented until 1553, after which it returned two Members of Parliament. It was a parliamentary borough consisting only of the town of Ripon itself until the Great Reform Act of 1832; the right to vote was vested in the holders of the tightly controlled burgage tenements — count-of-head polls were accordingly rare — for, the last contested election in Ripon before the Reform Act 1832 was in 1715.  By 1832 it was estimated that there were 43 men qualified to vote; the total of adult males over age 20 in the township in 1831 was recorded at 3,571.

Such a burgeoning middle class population when considered under the 1832 Reform Act made for Ripon a relatively major borough; its qualifying freehold-owning or more expensive house-leasing electorate were supplemented by such electors in neighbouring Aismunderby-cum-Bondgate. The sum of these male electors returned two members to each parliament. The next Reform Act which came into force at the 1868 election reduced Ripon's representation from two MPs to one and enfranchised many of the under-represented high-growth areas of Britain.

The Redistribution of Seats Act 1885 abolished the borough of Ripon; instead the county constituency in which the town was placed as a result was named Ripon (strictly speaking, at first, "The Ripon Division of the West Riding of Yorkshire"), and this continued as a single member constituency, with intervening boundary changes until it was abolished before the 1983 general election. Until 1950 it included, as well as Ripon itself, the towns of Harrogate and Knaresborough; the post-1950 guise took in Ilkley and Otley.

Boundaries
1885–1918: The Borough of Ripon, the Sessional Divisions of Claro and Kirkby Malzeard, and the Liberty of Ripon.

1918–1950: The Boroughs of Ripon and Harrogate, the Urban District of Knaresborough, the Rural Districts of Knaresborough, Pateley Bridge, and Ripon, and part of the Rural District of Great Ouseburn.

1950–1983: The Borough of Ripon, the Urban Districts of Ilkley and Otley, and the Rural Districts of Ripon and Pateley Bridge, and Wharfedale.

Members of Parliament
Constituency re-created (1553)

MPs 1553–1640

MPs 1640–1867

MPs 1868–1983

Election results

Elections in the 1830s

Elections in the 1840s

 

Sugden resigned after being appointed Lord Chancellor of Ireland, causing a by-election.

 

Pemberton resigned by accepting the office of Steward of the Chiltern Hundreds, causing a by-election,

 

Cusack-Smith resigned after being appointed Master of the Rolls in Ireland, causing a by-election.

Elections in the 1850s

Elections in the 1860s
Warre's death caused a by-election.

Lees retired before polling day.

 

Wood was elevated to the peerage becoming 1st Viscount Halifax and causing a by-election.

Hay was appointed a Lord Commissioner of the Admiralty, requiring a by-election.

Seat reduced to one member

Hay was appointed a Lord Commissioner of the Admiralty, requiring a by-election.

Elections in the 1870s
Hay resigned, causing a by-election.

Elections in the 1880s

Elections in the 1890s

Elections in the 1900s

Elections in the 1910s 

General election 1914–15:

Another general election was required to take place before the end of 1915. The political parties had been making preparations for an election to take place and by the July 1914, the following candidates had been selected; 
Unionist: Edward Wood
Liberal:

Elections in the 1920s

Elections in the 1930s

Elections in the 1940s

Elections in the 1950s

Elections in the 1960s

Elections in the 1970s

See also
 1973 Ripon by-election

References
 
D. Brunton & D. H. Pennington, Members of the Long Parliament (London: George Allen & Unwin, 1954)
"Cobbett's Parliamentary history of England, from the Norman Conquest in 1066 to the year 1803" (London: Thomas Hansard, 1808) 
F. W. S. Craig, "British Parliamentary Election Results 1832-1885" (2nd edition, Aldershot: Parliamentary Research Services, 1989)
F. W. S. Craig, "British Parliamentary Election Results 1918-1949" (Glasgow: Political Reference Publications, 1969)
J Holladay Philbin, "Parliamentary Representation 1832 - England and Wales" (New Haven: Yale University Press, 1965)
Henry Stooks Smith, "The Parliaments of England from 1715 to 1847" (2nd edition, edited by F. W. S. Craig - Chichester: Parliamentary Reference Publications, 1973)
 Frederic A Youngs, jr, "Guide to the Local Administrative Units of England, Vol II" (London: Royal Historical Society, 1991)
"The Constitutional Year Book for 1913" (London: National Union of Conservative and Unionist Associations, 1913)

Parliamentary constituencies in Yorkshire and the Humber (historic)
History of Ripon
Constituencies of the Parliament of the United Kingdom established in 1295
Constituencies of the Parliament of the United Kingdom disestablished in 1983
Politics of Ripon